Jerry Laymon Falwell Sr. (August 11, 1933 – May 15, 2007) was an American Baptist pastor, televangelist, and conservative activist. He was the founding pastor of the Thomas Road Baptist Church, a megachurch in Lynchburg, Virginia. He founded Lynchburg Christian Academy (now Liberty Christian Academy) in 1967, founded Liberty University in 1971, and co-founded the Moral Majority in 1979.

Early life and education
Falwell and his twin brother Gene were born in the Fairview Heights area of Lynchburg, Virginia, on August 11, 1933, the sons of Helen Virginia (née Beasley) and Carey Hezekiah Falwell. His father was an entrepreneur and one-time bootlegger who was agnostic who shot and killed his own brother Garland and died of cirrhosis of the liver in 1948 at the age of 55. His paternal grandfather was a staunch atheist. Falwell was a member of a group in Fairview Heights known to the police as "the Wall Gang" because they sat on a low concrete wall at the Pickeral Café. Falwell met Macel Pate on his first visit to Park Avenue Baptist Church in 1949, where she played piano. They married on April 12, 1958. The couple had sons Jerry Jr. (a lawyer, and former chancellor of Liberty University) and Jonathan (senior pastor at Thomas Road Baptist Church) and a daughter Jeannie (a surgeon).

Falwell and his wife had a close relationship, and she supported him throughout his career. The Falwells often appeared together in public, and they did not shy away from showing physical affection. Reflecting on his marriage, Falwell jokingly commented, "Macel and I have never considered divorce. Murder maybe, but never divorce." Macel appreciated her husband's non-combative, affable nature, writing in her book that he "hated confrontation and didn't want strife in our home... he did everything in his power to make me happy." The Falwells were married nearly fifty years until his death.

He graduated from Brookville High School in Lynchburg, and from the then-unaccredited Baptist Bible College in Springfield, Missouri, in 1956, where he enrolled in order to subvert Pate's relationship with her fiancé there. Falwell was later awarded three honorary doctorates: Doctor of Divinity from Tennessee Temple Theological Seminary, Doctor of Letters from California Graduate School of Theology, and Doctor of Laws from Central University in Seoul, South Korea.

Associated organizations

Thomas Road Baptist Church

In 1956, aged 22, Falwell founded the Thomas Road Baptist Church. Originally located at 701 Thomas Road in Lynchburg, Virginia, with 35 members, the church became a megachurch. In the same year, he began The Old-Time Gospel Hour, a nationally syndicated radio and television ministry. When Falwell died, his son Jonathan became heir to his father's ministry, and took over as the senior pastor of the church. At this time, the weekly program's name was changed to Thomas Road Live.

Liberty Christian Academy

During the 1950s and 1960s, Falwell spoke and campaigned against the civil rights activist Martin Luther King Jr. and the racial desegregation of public school systems by the US federal government. Liberty Christian Academy (LCA, founded as Lynchburg Christian Academy) is a Christian school in Lynchburg which was described in 1966 by the Lynchburg News as "a private school for white students".

The Lynchburg Christian Academy later opened in 1967 by Falwell as a segregation academy and as a ministry of Thomas Road Baptist Church.

The Liberty Christian Academy is today recognized as an educational facility by the Commonwealth of Virginia through the Virginia State Board of Education, Southern Association of Colleges and Schools, and the Association of Christian Schools International.

Liberty University

In 1971, Falwell co-founded Liberty University with Elmer L. Towns. Liberty University offers over 350 accredited programs of study, with approximately 13,000 residential students and 90,000 online.

Moral Majority

The Moral Majority became one of the largest political lobby groups for evangelical Christians in the United States during the 1980s. According to Falwell's self-published autobiography, the Moral Majority was promoted as being "pro-life, pro-traditional family, pro-moral, and pro-American" and was credited with delivering two thirds of the white evangelical vote to Ronald Reagan during the 1980 presidential election. According to Jimmy Carter, "that autumn [1980] a group headed by Jerry Falwell purchased $10 million in commercials on southern radio and TV to brand me as a traitor to the South and no longer a Christian." During his time as head of the Moral Majority, Falwell consistently pushed for Republican candidates and for conservative politics. This led Billy Graham to criticize him for "sermonizing" about political issues that lacked a moral element. Graham later stated at the time of Falwell's death, "We did not always agree on everything, but I knew him to be a man of God. His accomplishments went beyond most clergy of his generation."

PTL

In March 1987, Pentecostal televangelist Jim Bakker became the subject of media scrutiny when it was revealed that he had a sexual encounter (and alleged rape) with Jessica Hahn and had paid for her silence. Bakker believed that fellow Pentecostal pastor Jimmy Swaggart was attempting to take over his ministry because he had initiated a church investigation into allegations of his sexual misconduct. To avoid the takeover, Bakker resigned on March 19 and appointed Falwell to succeed him as head of his PTL ministry, which included the PTL Satellite Network, television program The PTL Club and the Christian-themed amusement park Heritage USA.

Bakker believed Falwell would temporarily lead the ministry until the scandal died down, but Falwell barred Bakker from returning to PTL on April 28, and referred to him as "probably the greatest scab and cancer on the face of Christianity in 2,000 years of church history". Later that summer, as donations to the ministry declined in the wake of Bakker's scandal and resignation, Falwell raised $20 million to keep PTL solvent and delivered on a promise to ride the water slide at Heritage USA. Despite this, Falwell was unable to bring the ministry out of bankruptcy and he resigned in October 1987.

Social and political views

Families
Falwell strongly advocated beliefs and practices influenced by his version of biblical teachings. The church, Falwell asserted, was the cornerstone of a successful family. Not only was it a place for spiritual learning and guidance, it was also a gathering place for fellowship and socializing with like-minded individuals. Often he built conversations he had with parishioners after the worship service into focused speeches or organized goals he would then present to a larger audience via his various media outlets.

Vietnam War
Falwell found the Vietnam War problematic because he felt it was being fought with "limited political objectives", when it should have been an all out war against the North. In general, Falwell held that the president "as a minister of God" has the right to use arms to "bring wrath upon those who would do evil."

Civil rights
On his evangelist program The Old-Time Gospel Hour in the mid-1960s, Falwell regularly featured segregationist politicians like governors Lester Maddox and George Wallace. About Martin Luther King he said: "I do question the sincerity and non-violent intentions of some civil rights leaders such as Dr. Martin Luther King Jr., Mr. James Farmer, and others, who are known to have left-wing associations."

In speaking of the Brown v. Board of Education ruling, he said, in 1958:

In 1977, Falwell supported Anita Bryant's campaign, which was called by its proponents "Save Our Children", to overturn an ordinance in Dade County, Florida, prohibiting discrimination on the basis of sexual orientation, and he supported a similar movement in California.

Twenty-eight years later, during a 2005 MSNBC television appearance, Falwell said he was not troubled by reports that the nominee for Chief Justice of the United States Supreme Court, John G. Roberts (whose appointment was confirmed by the US Senate) had done volunteer legal work for gay rights activists on the case of Romer v. Evans. Falwell told then-MSNBC host Tucker Carlson that if he were a lawyer, he too would argue for civil rights for LGBT people. "I may not agree with the lifestyle, but that has nothing to do with the civil rights of that part of our constituency", said Falwell. When Carlson countered that conservatives "are always arguing against 'special rights' for gays," Falwell said equal access to housing and employment are basic rights, not special rights. "Civil rights for all Americans, black, white, red, yellow, the rich, poor, young, old, gay, straight, et cetera, is not a liberal or conservative value. It's an American value that I would think that we pretty much all agree on."

Israel and Jews
Falwell's staunch pro-Israel stand, sometimes referred to as "Christian Zionism", drew the strong support of the Anti-Defamation League and its leader Abraham Foxman. However, they condemned what they perceived as intolerance towards Muslims in Falwell's public statements. They also criticized him for remarking that "Jews can make more money accidentally than you can on purpose." In his book Listen, America! Falwell referred to the Jewish people as "spiritually blind and desperately in need of their Messiah and Savior."

In the 1984 book Jerry Falwell and the Jews, Falwell is quoted saying:

Education
Falwell repeatedly denounced certain teachings in public schools and secular education in general, calling them breeding grounds for atheism, secularism, and humanism, which he claimed to be in contradiction with Christian morality. He advocated that the United States change its public education system by implementing a school voucher system which would allow parents to send their children to either public or private schools. In his book America Can Be Saved he wrote that "I hope I live to see the day when, as in the early days of our country, we won't have any public schools. The churches will have taken them over again and Christians will be running them."

Falwell supported President George W. Bush's Faith Based Initiative, but had strong reservations concerning where the funding would go and the restrictions placed on churches:

Apartheid
In the 1980s Falwell said sanctions against the apartheid regime of South Africa would result in what, he felt, would be a worse situation, such as a Soviet-backed revolution. He also urged his followers to buy up gold Krugerrands and push US "reinvestment" in South Africa. In 1985 he drew the ire of many when he called Nobel Peace Prize winner and Anglican Archbishop Desmond Tutu a phony "as far as representing the black people of South Africa".

The Clinton Chronicles

In 1994, Falwell promoted and distributed the video documentary The Clinton Chronicles: An Investigation into the Alleged Criminal Activities of Bill Clinton. The video purported to connect Bill Clinton to a murder conspiracy involving Vince Foster, James McDougall, Ron Brown, and a cocaine-smuggling operation. The theory was discredited, but the recording sold more than 150,000 copies.

The film's production costs were partly met by "Citizens for Honest Government", to which Falwell paid $200,000 in 1994 and 1995. In 1995 Citizens for Honest Government interviewed Arkansas state troopers Roger Perry and Larry Patterson regarding the murder conspiracy about Vincent Foster. Perry and Patterson also gave information regarding the allegations in the Paula Jones affair.

The infomercial for the 80-minute videotape included footage of Falwell interviewing a silhouetted journalist who claimed to be afraid for his life. The journalist accused Clinton of orchestrating the deaths of several reporters and personal confidants who had gotten too close to his supposed illegal activities. The silhouetted journalist was subsequently revealed to be Patrick Matrisciana, the producer of the video and president of Citizens for Honest Government. "Obviously, I'm not an investigative reporter", Matrisciana admitted to investigative journalist Murray Waas. Later, Falwell seemed to back away from personally trusting the video. In an interview for the 2005 documentary The Hunting of the President, Falwell admitted, "to this day I do not know the accuracy of the claims made in The Clinton Chronicles."

Views on homosexuality
Falwell condemned homosexuality as forbidden by the Bible. Gay rights groups called Falwell an "agent of intolerance" and "the founder of the anti-gay industry" for statements he had made and for campaigning against LGBT social movements. Falwell supported Anita Bryant's 1977 "Save Our Children" campaign to overturn a Florida ordinance prohibiting discrimination on the basis of sexual orientation and a similar movement in California. In urging the repeal of the ordinance, Falwell told one crowd, "Gay folks would just as soon kill you as look at you." When the LGBT-friendly Metropolitan Community Church was almost accepted into the World Council of Churches, Falwell called them "brute beasts" and stated that they are, "part of a vile and satanic system" that "will be utterly annihilated, and there will be a celebration in heaven." He later denied saying this. Falwell also regularly linked the AIDS pandemic to LGBT issues and stated, "AIDS is not just God's punishment for homosexuals, it is God's punishment for the society that tolerates homosexuals."

After comedian and actress Ellen DeGeneres came out as a lesbian, Falwell referred to her in a sermon as "Ellen DeGenerate". DeGeneres responded, "Really, he called me that? Ellen DeGenerate? I've been getting that since the fourth grade. I guess I'm happy I could give him work."

Falwell's legacy regarding homosexuality is complicated by his support for LGBT civil rights (see "civil rights" section above), as well as his attempts to reconcile with the LGBT community in later years. In October 1999, Falwell hosted a meeting of 200 evangelicals with 200 gay people and lesbians at Thomas Road Baptist Church for an "Anti-Violence Forum", during which he acknowledged that some American evangelicals' comments about homosexuality entered the realm of hate speech that could incite violence. At the forum, Falwell told homosexuals in attendance, "I don't agree with your lifestyle, I will never agree with your lifestyle, but I love you" and added, "Anything that leaves the impression that we hate the sinner, we want to change that." He later commented to New York Times columnist Frank Rich that "admittedly, evangelicals have not exhibited an ability to build a bond of friendship to the gay and lesbian community. We've said go somewhere else, we don't need you here [at] our churches."

Teletubbies
In February 1999, an unsigned article that media outlets attributed to Falwell was published in the National Liberty Journal a promotional publication of the university he founded claimed that the purple Teletubby named Tinky Winky was intended as a gay role model. An article published in 1998 by the Salon website had noted Tinky Winky's status as a gay icon. In response, Steve Rice, spokesperson for Itsy Bitsy Entertainment, which licenses the Teletubbies in the United States, said, "I really find it absurd and kind of offensive." The UK show was aimed at pre-school children, but the article stated "he is purple – the gay pride color; and his antenna is shaped like a triangle – the gay-pride symbol". Apart from those characteristics Tinky Winky also carries a magic bag which the NLJ and Salon articles said was a purse. Falwell added that "role modeling the gay lifestyle is damaging to the moral lives of children".

September 11 attacks
Following the September 11 attacks in 2001, Falwell said on Pat Robertson's The 700 Club, "I really believe that the pagans, and the abortionists, and the feminists, and the gays and the lesbians who are actively trying to make that an alternative lifestyle, the ACLU, People for the American Way, all of them who have tried to secularize America. I point the finger in their face and say 'you helped this happen.'" In his opinion, LGBT organizations had angered God, thereby in part causing God to let the attacks happen. Falwell believed the attacks were "probably deserved", a statement which Christopher Hitchens described as treason. Following heavy criticism, Falwell said that no one but the terrorists were to blame, and stated, "If I left that impression with gays or lesbians or anyone else, I apologize." Falwell was subsequently the object of some of his own followers' outrage for retracting his statements about divine judgment on America and its causes, because they had heard the same themes in his preaching over many years that America must repent of its lack of devotion to God, immoral living, and timid support of Israel if America wanted divine protection and blessing.

Labor unions
Falwell also said, "Labor unions should study and read the Bible instead of asking for more money. When people get right with God, they are better workers."

Relationship with American fundamentalism

Falwell set out in his Christian ministry as a fundamentalist, having attended a conservative Bible college and following strict standards of ecclesiastical and personal separatism; he was thus known and respected in Independent Fundamental Baptist circles, being praised in Christian fundamentalist publications such as The Sword of the Lord. Though he never officially stated his rejection of this movement, the evidence of his life from the late 1970s onwards indicates that he moved toward a conservative evangelical standpoint to the right of mainline Protestantism or "open" evangelicalism but to the left of traditional, separatist fundamentalism. It was reported that he had refused to attend parties at which alcohol was served early in his life, but he relaxed this stricture as he was increasingly invited to major events through the contacts which he developed in conservative politics and religion.

His foray into national politics appears to have been a catalyst for this change; when he established the Moral Majority which joined "Bible Christians" (Independent and conservative Southern Baptists) in a political alliance with charismatics, Roman Catholics, Jews, Mormons and others and rejected the level of separation that was preached by most movement fundamentalists. Bob Jones University declared that the Moral Majority organization "was Satanic", holding the view that it was a step towards the apostate one-world church and government body because it would cross the line from a political alliance to a religious one between true Christians and the non-born-again, which was forbidden by their interpretation of the Bible. David Cloud's Way of Life Literature also criticized Falwell for his associations with Catholics, Pentecostals and liberal Christians, tracing his alleged "apostasy" back to his role in the political Religious Right.

Though he never wavered in his belief in the inerrancy of the Bible (except for moderating its alleged view of racial differences, the significance of baptism, and other concepts relative to his theology) and the doctrines which conservative Christians widely see as essential to salvation, his rhetoric generally became more mellow, less militant and comparatively more inclusive from the 1980s onwards. Cultural anthropologist Susan Friend Harding, in her extensive ethnographic study of Falwell, noted that he adapted his preaching to win a broader, less extremist audience as he grew famous. This manifested itself in several ways: For example, he no longer condemned "worldly" lifestyle choices such as dancing, drinking wine, and attending movie theaters; softening his rhetoric which predicted an apocalypse and God's vengeful wrath; and shifting from a belief in outright biblical patriarchy to a complementarian view of appropriate gender roles. He further mainstreamed himself by aiming his strongest criticism at "secular humanists", pagans or various liberals in place of the racist, anti-Semitic and anti-Catholic rhetoric that was common among Southern fundamentalist preachers but increasingly condemned as hate speech by the consensus of American society.

Islam
Falwell opposed Islam. According to Asharq Al-Awsat, a pan-Arab newspaper, Falwell called Islam "satanic". In a televised interview with 60 Minutes, Falwell called Muhammad a "terrorist", to which he added: "I concluded from reading Muslim and non-Muslim writers that Muhammad was a violent man, a man of war." Falwell later apologized to Muslims for what he had said about Muhammad and affirmed that he did not necessarily intend to offend "honest and peace-loving" Muslims. However, as he refused to remove his comments about Islam from his website, the sincerity of his apology was doubted. Egyptian Christian intellectuals, in response, signed a statement in which they condemned and rejected what Falwell had said about Muhammad being a terrorist.

Legal issues
From the 1970s on, Falwell was involved in legal matters which occupied much of his time and propelled his name recognition.

SEC and bonds
In 1972, the US Securities and Exchange Commission (SEC) launched an investigation of bonds issued by Falwell's organizations. The SEC charged Falwell's church with "fraud and deceit" in the issuance of $6.5 million in unsecured church bonds. The church won a 1973 federal court case prosecuted at the behest of the SEC, in which the court exonerated the church and ruled that while technical violations of law did occur, there was no proof the church intended any wrongdoing.

Falwell versus Penthouse
Falwell filed a $10 million lawsuit against Penthouse for publishing an article based upon interviews he gave to freelance reporters, after failing to convince a federal court to place an injunction upon the publication of that article. The suit was dismissed in Federal district court in 1981 on the grounds that the article was not defamatory or an invasion of Falwell's privacy (the Virginia courts had not recognized this privacy tort, which is recognized in other states).

Hustler Magazine v. Falwell

In 1983, Larry Flynt's pornographic magazine Hustler carried a parody of a Campari ad, featuring a mock "interview" with Falwell in which he admits that his "first time" was incest with his mother in an outhouse while drunk. Falwell sued for $45 million, alleging invasion of privacy, libel, and intentional infliction of emotional distress. A jury rejected the invasion of privacy and libel claims, holding that the parody could not have reasonably been taken to describe true events, but ruled in favor of Falwell on the emotional distress claim and awarded damages of $200,000. This was upheld on appeal. Flynt then appealed to the US Supreme Court, which unanimously held that the First Amendment prevents public figures from recovering damages for emotional distress caused by parodies.

After Falwell's death, Larry Flynt released a comment regarding his friendship over the years with Falwell.

My mother always told me that no matter how much you dislike a person, when you meet them face to face you will find characteristics about them that you like. Jerry Falwell was a perfect example of that. I hated everything he stood for, but after meeting him in person, years after the trial, Jerry Falwell and I became good friends. He would visit me in California and we would debate together on college campuses. I always appreciated his sincerity even though I knew what he was selling and he knew what I was selling.

Falwell versus Jerry Sloan

In 1984, Falwell was ordered to pay gay rights activist and former Baptist Bible College classmate Jerry Sloan $5,000 after losing a court battle. In July 1984 during a televised debate in Sacramento, California, Falwell denied calling the gay-friendly Metropolitan Community Churches "brute beasts" and "a vile and Satanic system" that will "one day be utterly annihilated and there will be a celebration in heaven".

When Sloan insisted he had a tape, Falwell promised $5,000 if he could produce it. Sloan did, Falwell refused to pay, and Sloan successfully sued. The money was donated to build Sacramento's first LGBT community center, the Lambda Community Center, serving "lesbian, gay, bisexual, transgender, and intersex" communities. Falwell appealed the decision with his attorney charging that the Jewish judge in the case was prejudiced. He lost again and was made to pay an additional $2,875 in sanctions and court fees.

Trademark infringement lawsuit against Christopher Lamparello 

In Lamparello v. Falwell, a dispute over the ownership of the Internet domain fallwell.com, the United States Court of Appeals for the Fourth Circuit reversed an earlier District Court decision, arguing that Christopher Lamparello, who owned the domain, "clearly created his website intending only to provide a forum to criticize ideas, not to steal customers." Lamparello's website describes itself as not being connected to Jerry Falwell and is critical of Falwell's views on homosexuality. On April 17, 2006, the Supreme Court declined to hear an appeal of the Court of Appeals ruling that Lamparello's usage of the domain was legal.

Previous to this, a different man had turned over jerryfalwell.com and jerryfallwell.com after Falwell threatened to sue for trademark infringement. Lawyers for Public Citizen Litigation Group's Internet Free Speech project represented the domain name owners in both cases.

Apocalyptic beliefs
On July 31, 2006, CNN's Paula Zahn Now program featured a segment on "whether the crisis in the Middle East is actually a prelude to the end of the world". In an interview Falwell claimed, "I believe in the premillennial, pre-tribulational coming of Christ for all of his church, and to summarize that, your first poll, do you believe Jesus' coming the second time will be in the future, I would vote yes with the 59 percent and with Billy Graham and most evangelicals."

Based on this and other statements, Falwell has been identified as a dispensationalist.

In 1999, Falwell declared the Antichrist would probably arrive within a decade and "of course he'll be Jewish". After accusations of anti-Semitism Falwell apologized and explained he was simply expressing the theological tenet that the Antichrist and Christ share many attributes.

Failing health and death
In early 2005, Falwell was hospitalized for two weeks with a viral infection, discharged, and then rehospitalized on May 30, 2005, in respiratory arrest. He was subsequently released from the hospital and returned to his duties. Later in 2005, a stent was implanted to treat a 70 percent blockage in his coronary arteries.

On May 15, 2007, Falwell was found without pulse and unconscious in his office at about 10:45 a.m., after he missed a morning appointment, and was taken to Lynchburg General Hospital. "I had breakfast with him, and he was fine at breakfast ... He went to his office, I went to mine and they found him unresponsive," said Ron Godwin, the executive vice president of Falwell's Liberty University. His condition was initially reported as "gravely serious"; CPR was administered unsuccessfully. At 2:10 p.m., during a live press conference, a doctor for the hospital confirmed that Falwell had died of "cardiac arrhythmia, or sudden cardiac death". A statement issued by the hospital reported he was pronounced dead at Lynchburg General Hospital at 12:40 p.m., at the age of 73. Falwell's family, including his wife, the former Macel Pate (1933–2015), and sons, Jerry Falwell Jr. and Jonathan Falwell, were at the hospital at the time of the pronouncement.

Falwell's funeral took place on May 22, 2007, at Thomas Road Baptist Church after he lay in repose both at the church and at Liberty University. Falwell's burial service was private. He is interred at a spot on the Liberty University campus near the Carter Glass Mansion and Falwell's office. Buried nearby is his mentor, B. R. Lakin.

After his death, his sons succeeded him at his two positions; Jerry Falwell Jr. took over as president of Liberty University while Jonathan Falwell became the senior pastor of Thomas Road Baptist Church. His daughter, Jeannie F. Savas, is a surgeon.

The last televised interview with Jerry Falwell Sr. was conducted by Christiane Amanpour for the CNN original series CNN Presents: God's Warriors. He had been interviewed on May 8, one week before his death; in the interview he revealed that he had asked God for at least 20 more years in order to accomplish his vision for the university he founded. Falwell's last televised sermon was his May 13, 2007, message on Mother's Day.

Legacy
Views on Falwell's legacy are mixed. Supporters praise his advancement of his socially conservative message. They also tout his evangelist ministries, and his stress on church planting and growth. Conversely, many of his detractors have accused him of hate speech and identified him as an "agent of intolerance".

The antitheistic social commentator Christopher Hitchens described his work as "Chaucerian fraud" and a "faith-based fraud." Hitchens took special umbrage with Falwell's alignment with "the most thuggish and demented Israeli settlers", and his declaration that 9/11 represented God's judgment on America's sinful behaviour; deeming it "extraordinary that not even such a scandalous career is enough to shake our dumb addiction to the 'faith-based.'" Hitchens also mentioned that, despite his support for Israel, Falwell "kept saying to his own crowd, yes, you have got to like the Jews, because they can make more money in 10 minutes than you can make in a lifetime". Appearing on CNN a day after Falwell's death, Hitchens said, "The empty life of this ugly little charlatan proves only one thing: that you can get away with the most extraordinary offenses to morality and to truth in this country if you will just get yourself called 'reverend'."

At one point, prank callers, especially gay activists, constituted an estimated 25 percent of Falwell's total calls, until the ministry disconnected the toll-free number in 1986. Edward Johnson, in the mid-1980s, programmed his Atari home computer to make thousands of repeat phone calls to Falwell's 1-800 phone number, since Johnson claimed Falwell had swindled large amounts of money from his followers, including Johnson's own mother. Southern Bell forced Johnson to stop after he had run up Falwell's telephone bill an estimated $500,000.

Falwell's son, Jerry Falwell Jr., is an American lawyer who took over as the president of Liberty University upon his father's death, serving until being put on indefinite leave on August 7, 2020, after posting an inappropriate photo with a young woman on social media. He then resigned on August 24 amid further questions about his and his wife's sexual and financial involvement with an associate. Falwell Jr. later said that the real reason his father began attending church as a teenager was because he had fallen in love with Macel (who played piano there, and was engaged at the time). Later he used deception to convince her to break off the engagement.

Filmmaker Terrence Malick had intended to write and direct a film that focuses on the lives of both Jerry Falwell and pianist-singer Jerry Lee Lewis since the 1980s, but the project went unproduced.

Publications

Champions for God. Victor Books, 1985. 
Church Aflame. (co-author Elmer Towns) Impact, 1971.
Dynamic Faith Journal. Thomas Nelson (64 pages) (January 30, 2006) 
Falwell: An Autobiography. Liberty House, 1996. (Ghost written by Mel White) 
Fasting Can Change Your Life. Regal, 1998. 
Finding Inner Peace and Strength. Doubleday, 1982.
If I Should Die Before I Wake. Thomas Nelson, 1986. (ghost-written by Mel White)
Jerry Falwell: Aflame for God. Thomas Nelson, 1979. (co-authors Gerald Strober and Ruth Tomczak)
Liberty Bible Commentary on the New Testament. Thomas Nelson/Liberty University, 1978.
Liberty Bible Commentary. Thomas Nelson, 1982.
Listen, America! Bantam Books (July 1981) 
Stepping Out on Faith. Tyndale House, 1984. 
Strength for the Journey. Simon & Schuster, 1987. (ghost-written by Mel White)
The Fundamentalist Phenomenon. Doubleday, 1981. 
The Fundamentalist Phenomenon/The Resurgence of Conservative Christianity. Baker Book House, 1986.
The New American Family. Word, 1992. 
When It Hurts Too Much to Cry. Tyndale House, 1984. 
Wisdom for Living. Victor Books, 1984.

See also
Christian fundamentalism
Faith and Values Coalition
Jerry Johnston
List of fatwas
List of Southern Baptist Convention affiliated people
National Christian Network

Notes

References

Footnotes

Bibliography

External links

Jerry Falwell Ministries
Jerry Falwell Photo Gallery (1933–2007) from Time.com

 
1933 births
2007 deaths
20th-century American male writers
20th-century American non-fiction writers
20th-century apocalypticists
20th-century Baptist ministers from the United States
21st-century American male writers
21st-century American non-fiction writers
21st-century apocalypticists
21st-century Baptist ministers from the United States
Activists from Virginia
American anti-abortion activists
American Christian creationists
American Christian Zionists
American critics of Islam
American evangelicals
American male non-fiction writers
American segregationists
American television evangelists
American twins
Anti-pornography activists
Baptist Bible College (Missouri) alumni
Baptists from Virginia
Baptist writers
Burials in Virginia
Christian critics of Islam
Christian fundamentalists
Heads of universities and colleges in the United States
Liberty University people
Male critics of feminism
New Right (United States)
People from Lynchburg, Virginia
Religious controversies in the United States
School segregation in the United States
Southern Baptist ministers
University and college founders
Virginia Republicans
Writers from Lynchburg, Virginia